Loyola O'Driscoll is a Canadian politician, who was elected to the Newfoundland and Labrador House of Assembly in the 2019 provincial election. He represents the electoral district of Ferryland as a member of the Newfoundland and Labrador Progressive Conservative Party. He was re-elected in the 2021 provincial election.

Prior to politics, O'Driscoll worked for Hickman Motors.

Election results

References

Living people
Progressive Conservative Party of Newfoundland and Labrador MHAs
21st-century Canadian politicians
Year of birth missing (living people)